Olearia astroloba, commonly known as marble daisy-bush, is a species of flowering plant in the family Asteraceae and is endemic to a restricted area of Victoria in Australia. It is a greyish shrub with sessile, spatula-shaped leaves and mauve or violet and purple, daisy-like inflorescences.

Description 
The lower surface of the leaves is densely covered with woolly, star-shaped hairs.

Taxonomy 
Olearia astroloba was first formally described in 1989 by Nicholas Sean Lander and Neville Grant Walsh in the journal Muelleria based on plant material collected from Marble Gully in 1988. The specific epithet (astroloba) means "star-shaped lobes", referring to the hairs on the disc florets.

Distribution and habitat 
Marble daisy-bush is restricted to Marble Gully, near Mount Tambo in East Gippsland, Victoria. It grows on skeletal soils on steep north-facing slopes at an altitude of about  near the headwaters of the Tambo River. Associated plant species are Allocasuarina verticillata, Eucalyptus nortonii, Pomaderris oraria subsp. calcicola, Ozothamnus adnatus and Themeda triandra.

Conservation 
Olearia astroloba is listed as "vulnerable" under the Australian Government Environment Protection and Biodiversity Conservation Act 1999 and as "threatened" under the Victorian Government Flora and Fauna Guarantee Act 1988. The total population is estimated to be 1,030 plants within a 40 hectare area. Potential threats include inappropriate fire regimes, weed invasion, grazing by stock and rabbits and mining for marble.

Use in horticulture
The species prefer a well-drained position in full sun or part shade. It is able to withstand drought and moderate frost. Pruning promotes new growth and increased flowering. Propagation is by cuttings or seed, though a large percentage of the latter is often non-viable.

References

astroloba
Flora of Victoria (Australia)
Taxa named by Neville Grant Walsh
Plants described in 1989